Kairak is a Papuan language spoken in East New Britain Province on the island of New Britain, Papua New Guinea. It is spoken in Ivere and Malabunga villages of Inland Baining Rural LLG.

References

Languages of East New Britain Province
Baining languages